Nine till Six is a 1932 British drama film directed by Basil Dean and starring Louise Hampton, Elizabeth Allan and Florence Desmond. Produced by Basil Dean's Associated Talking Pictures, it was the first film made at Ealing Studios after the facility had been converted to sound.

Plot
Two women of different social backgrounds work together in a dressmaker's.

Cast
 Louise Hampton as Madam
 Elizabeth Allan as Gracie Abbott
 Florence Desmond as Daisy
 Isla Bevan as Ailene Pannarth
 Richard Bird as Jimmie Pennarth
 Frances Doble as Clare
 Jeanne de Casalis as Yvonne
 Kay Hammond as Beatrice
 Sunday Wilshin as Judy
 Alison Leggatt as Freda
 Moore Marriott as Doorman

References

Bibliography
 Low, Rachael. Filmmaking in 1930s Britain. George Allen & Unwin, 1985.
 Perry, George. Forever Ealing. Pavilion Books, 1994.

External links

1932 films
British drama films
1932 drama films
British films based on plays
Films directed by Basil Dean
Associated Talking Pictures
British black-and-white films
Films with screenplays by John Paddy Carstairs
1930s English-language films
1930s British films